Kalpavriksh is a non-profit organisation based in India with its office in Pune, Maharashtra. The organisation takes up research, networking, education, grassroots work, advocacy and activism in the field of environment, ecology, development, and alternatives. The institute was formed in 1979 when a student-led group began to campaign for Delhi Ridge Forest.

Focus areas 
Kaplavriksh organisation works in five major focus areas.

Alternatives
It refers to initiatives proposed in consent with different stakeholders such as civil society organizations, government, individuals, communities, and more. The initiatives carry features such as ecological sustainability, social well-being and justice, direct democracy, economic democracy, and more.

Conservation and livelihoods
This program has its traces from institutes earliest initiatives since the early 1980s. It deals with activities such as field documentation, legal and policy analysis, biodiversity campaigns, protected area update etc.

Environment education
It aims at sustainable use and conservation of natural resources by raising awareness with education to incorporate social equity and ecological sustainability. The goal is to make children sensitive about environment issues besides raising awareness and to develop and implement, decentralised (local) materials and programs for the conservation of the environment.

Urban environment
Its focus is on care and protection of standing trees in urban areas such as river front, public gardens, ridge forests etc. It also monitors several urban development activities that may prove detrimental to trees such as road widening, construction of flyovers, footpath design etc. The institute is also working in collaboration with the Government of the National Capital Territory of Delhi to provide for tree authority and tree helpline for a better implementation.

Economic and development
The institute investigates research on environmental regulatory regimes that concern the individual's environment and livelihood. They comprise issues related to coastal regulations, forest clearance for projects etc. Right to Information Act, 2005 usage remain central to this focus area.

See also 
 Ashish Kothari

References

External links 

 Official website

Climate change in India
Climate change organizations
Environmental organisations based in India
Multidisciplinary research institutes
Environmental research institutes
1979 establishments in Maharashtra